The Al-Salam Mosque and Arabian Cultural Center are located in Odesa, Ukraine. The cultural center and mosque were opened in June 2001.

History

Odesa Muslims have a long tradition. The city of Odesa was built on the site of an ancient Tatar settlement called Hadzhibey. The settlement was founded by Hacı I Giray, the Khan of Crimea, in 1240 and originally named after him as Hacıbey (pronounced the same as Hadzhibey).

A Tatar mosque, built by renowned architect Karbalayi Safikhan Karabakhi was located in the center of the city, alongside it a Muslim cemetery. With the arrival of Soviet power life dramatically changed for Odesa Muslims.  Tatar mullah, Sabirzyan Safarov was shot, the mosque closed and later destroyed. The Muslim cemetery was also razed.

The Arabian Cultural Center was constructed at the expense of the Syrian businessman Kivan Adnan. The center operates a free school and library for teaching Arabic to everyone regardless of age or nationality.

External links

 Арабский культурный центр 
 Аднан Киван о центре
 Архитекторы о центре
 Религия в Украине

Arab diaspora in Europe
Mosques in Ukraine
Mosques completed in 2001
21st-century mosques
Religious buildings and structures in Odesa
Tatar culture
Tatars in Ukraine